This is a list of notable Arab Israeli Citizens

Academia
 Nur-eldeen Masalha
 Salman Abu Sitta

Culture

 Hiam Abbass
 Mira Awad
 Mohammad Bakri
 Elham Dwairy Tabry
 Emile Habibi
 Rashid Hussein
 Sayed Kashua
 Salman Masalha
 Azmi Nassar
 Samih al-Qasim
 Rana Raslan, Miss Israel 1999
 Anton Shammas

Elected office

 Mansour Abbas
 Hamad Abu Rabia
 Mohammad Barakeh
 Azmi Bishara
 Hussniya Jabara
 Ayoob Kara
 Raleb Majadele
 Issam Makhoul
 Nawaf Massalha
 Mohammed Miari
 Muhammad Al-Nabari
 Raed Salah
 Ibrahim Sarsur
 Hana Sweid
 Wasil Taha
 Salah Tarif
 Ahmad Tibi
 Rifaat Turk
 Jamal Zahalka
 Tawfiq Ziad

Law
 Elias Khoury, lawyer

Military
 Imad Fares, IDF brigadier general
 Yusef Mishleb, IDF major general
 Amos Yarkoni, IDF lieutenant colonel

Public service
 Salim Joubran, Israeli Supreme Court justice
 Ishmael Khaldi, Israeli deputy consul in San Francisco
 Ali Yahya, former Israeli ambassador to Finland
 Abdel Rahman Zuabi, former Israeli Supreme Court justice

Sports

 Mohamed Abu Arisha (born 1997) - professional and Team Israel basketball player
Marian Awad (born 1996) - Team Israel footballer
 Mu'nas Dabbur (born 1992) - professional and Team Israel footballer
Hatem Abd Elhamed (born 1991) - professional and Team Israel footballer
 Marc Hinawi (born 1997) - swimmer
Beram Kayal (born 1988) - professional and Team Israel footballer
Eduard Meron (born 1938) - Israeli Olympic weightlifter
 Dia Saba (born 1992) - professional and Team Israel footballer
Ranin Salameh (born 1996) - Team Israel footballer
Nora Shanab (born 1987) - Team Israel footballer
 Salim Tuama (born 1979) - professional and Team Israel footballer

See also
 List of Israeli Arab Muslims
 List of Israeli Arab Christians
 

 
Arabs
Arab
Lists of Arabs
Arab